Matthéo Xantippe (born 11 April 2002) is a French professional football player who plays for Ligue 2 club Amiens.

Club career 
Matthéo Xantippe made his professional debut for Amiens on the 24 July 2021.

Personal life
Xantippe's grandfather, Edouard Xantippe, was a Guadeloupean footballer who also played for Amiens in the 1970s. Edouard's brother, Claude, also played for Amiens.

References

External links

FFF Profile

2002 births
Living people
French footballers
France youth international footballers
French people of Guadeloupean descent
Association football defenders
Sportspeople from Amiens
Amiens SC players
Ligue 2 players
Footballers from Hauts-de-France